Can Bonomo (Hebrew: ג'אן בונומו, born 16 May 1987) is a Turkish singer of Jewish descent who represented Turkey in the Eurovision Song Contest 2012 in Baku, Azerbaijan.

Early life
Bonomo was born in İzmir, Turkey to a Sephardic Jewish family. At the age of 17, he began his official career as a vocal productionist in Istanbul. At the same time, Bonomo went on with studying TV and cinema at the Istanbul Bilgi University with his programmes being aired on popular radio channels such as Number 1 FM, Radio101 and Radio Class. Then his radio programmes were followed by programmes in international TV channels such as MTV and Number One TV. Also, he composed the songs for other singers.

After his musical career, he began to write poetry and publish poetry books. His first poetry book was named Delirmek Belirmektir (2014) and it was published by Küçük İskender. Also, his illustrations were published.

Eurovision 2012
In January 2012, he was internally selected to represent Turkey in the Eurovision Song Contest 2012 in Baku, Azerbaijan. In February 2012, Can revealed his song "Love Me Back" to the public. He placed seventh with the song at the contest's final competition on 26 May 2012. He was also the last representative of Turkey at Eurovision, as the country withdrew from Eurovision the following year and has yet to return.

Discography

Albums
 Meczup (2011)
 Aşktan Ve Gariplikten (2012)
 Bulunmam Gerek (2014)
 Kâinat Sustu (2017)
 Ruhum Bela (2019)

Maxi singles
 Rüyamda Buluttum / Acı Kiraz (2021)

Non-album Singles

Filmography

Television

Cinema

Poem books
Delirmek Belirmektir (2013)
Şu Sevdalar Tevatürü (2016)
Parya Koma (2018)

Awards
 8th Radio Boğaziçi Music Awards – Best New Artist
 38th Golden Butterfly Television Awards – Best New Artist
 2nd OMÜ Media Awards – Best New Artist
 European Journalists Association Awards – Best Pop/Rock Music Artist of the Year
 10th Radio Boğaziçi Music Awards – Best Alternative Music Artist
 15th Radio Boğaziçi Music Awards "Best Album " 
 15th Radio Boğaziçi Music Awards "Best Duet " Terslik Var feat. Ceza

References

External links
Official website

1987 births
Living people
Turkish musicians
Eurovision Song Contest entrants of 2012
Eurovision Song Contest entrants for Turkey
Musicians from İzmir
Istanbul Bilgi University alumni
Smyrniote Jews
Turkish Jews
21st-century Turkish singers
21st-century Turkish male singers
Jewish singers
Turkish podcasters
Turkish broadcasters